The 1932–33 Campionat de Catalunya season was the 34th since its establishment and was played between 28 August and 8 December 1932.

Overview before the season
Eight teams joined the Division One league, including two that would play the 1932–33 La Liga and six from the 1932–33 Tercera División.

From La Liga
Barcelona
Espanyol

From Tercera División

Badalona
Júpiter
Martinenc
Palafrugell
Sabadell
Sants

Division One

League table

Results

Top goalscorers

Play-off league

Division Two

Group A

Group B

Final group

Copa Catalunya seasons
1932–33 in Spanish football